Barbro Martinsson (born 16 August 1935) is a former Swedish cross-country skier who competed during the 1960s. Born in Valbo, she won two silver medals in the 3 × 5 km relay at the 1964 Winter Olympics and the 1968 Winter Olympics. Martinsson finished fourth in the 1968 Winter Olympics in both 5 km and 10 km.

She also won two medals in the 3 × 5 km relay at the FIS Nordic World Ski Championships with a silver in 1962 and a bronze in 1966.

Martinsson also won the 10 km event at the Holmenkollen ski festival in 1964.

In total she has won 57 district championships in different sports, including handball.

Cross-country skiing results
All results are sourced from the International Ski Federation (FIS).

Olympic Games
 2 medals – (2 silver)

World Championships
 2 medals – (1 silver, 1 bronze)

References

External links
 
  
 
 

1935 births
Living people
People from Sundsvall Municipality
Cross-country skiers at the 1956 Winter Olympics
Cross-country skiers at the 1960 Winter Olympics
Cross-country skiers at the 1964 Winter Olympics
Cross-country skiers at the 1968 Winter Olympics
Holmenkollen Ski Festival winners
Olympic cross-country skiers of Sweden
Swedish female cross-country skiers
Olympic medalists in cross-country skiing
FIS Nordic World Ski Championships medalists in cross-country skiing
Medalists at the 1964 Winter Olympics
Medalists at the 1968 Winter Olympics
Olympic silver medalists for Sweden
20th-century Swedish women